Love of Thousand Years is a 2020 Chinese television series based on the novel The Killing of Three Thousand Crows by Shi Silang. It stars Zheng Yecheng and Zhao Lusi.

Synopsis
A story about a forbidden love that transcends a thousand years and ten lifetimes.

Cast
Zheng Yecheng as Fu Jiuyun
Zhao Lusi as Qin Chuan / Ah Man
Jiang Yiyi as Di Nü (Yan Yan)
Liu Yitong as Zuo Zichen
Wang Mengli as Xuan Zhu
Dai Yunfan as Yun Zhou
Mao Fangyuan as Ting Zhou
Wang Chunyuan as Xiangqu Mountain Master
Zhang Xingzhe as Left Minister
Li Luqi as Meishan Lord
Li Mingjun as Bai Gongzi
Xu Mengyuan as Cui Ya
Ding Ziling as Madame Qiu Hua
Guo Qiming as Guo Shi  Nan Man Demon King
Gao Jicai as Second prince
Zhang Dingding as Qing Qing
Lu Tingyu as Yi Xin
Canti Lau as Bao An Emperor
Qiao Hong as Queen of Li Kingdom
Zhao Rui as Empress of Tian Yuan
Jin Long as Emperor of Tian Yuan

Soundtrack

International broadcast

References

Xianxia television series
Chinese romantic fantasy television series
Television shows based on Chinese novels
2020 Chinese television series debuts
Mango TV original programming